A massage chair is a chair designed for massages. It can refer to two types of products. Traditional massage chairs allow a masseur to easily access the head, shoulders, and back of a massage recipient, while robotic massage chairs use electronic vibrators and motors to provide a massage.

History 
The first massage chair was designed in 1954 by Nobuo Fujimoto. He made various versions of the chair from scrap materials before he was entirely satisfied with the chair.

Types

Traditional

Chair Massage is done in an ergonomically designed portable chair. Chair massage focuses on the head, neck, shoulders, back, arms and hands. Massage therapists are able to offer on-site massage to many environments because of the portability of the massage chair, and clients do not need to disrobe to receive a chair massage. Due to these two factors, chair massage is often performed in settings such as business offices, employee appreciation events, trade shows, conferences, and other corporate settings.

Robotic

A robotic massage chair contains internal electronic motors and gears designed to massage the person sitting in them.  Most robotic massage chairs have some form of controller to vary the type, location, or intensity of the massage. The first electric massage chair was invented in Japan before World War II.

Massaging chairs most frequently resemble recliners. There are many different types and brands, including office-style chairs that operate from internal batteries.  A less expensive option is a separate massaging pad that may be used with an existing chair.

The benefits of a massage chair include deep relaxation, reduced blood pressure, a lowering of the pulse rate, and increased metabolism.

Massage chairs are designed to mimic the hand motions of a massage therapist. They use a combination of massage rollers and airbags to massage the different parts of the body. 

Robotic massage chairs were first brought to market in 1954 by the Family Fujiryoki company. Today, Japan is the largest consumer of massage chairs with some surveys suggesting that over 20% of Japanese households actually own a massage chair.

Massage chairs vary tremendously in price, style and intensity, from cheap "vibrate only" chairs to full intensity Shiatsu models.

See also 
 Back pain
 Massage table
 Shiatsu

References

Chairs
Shiatsu
Massage
Massage devices
Japanese inventions